William Thomson (15 August 1880 – 25 August 1942) was a Scotland international rugby union player. He played at the Forward position.

Rugby Union career

Amateur career

Thomson played for West of Scotland.

Provincial career

He was capped by Glasgow District in 1906. He was later capped that same season by the Cities District side.

International career

Thomson was capped by Scotland for just one match. This was the touring match against South Africa at Hampden Park on 17 November 1906. Scotland won the match 6 - 0.

References

1880 births
1942 deaths
People from Haslingden
Scottish rugby union players
Rugby union players from Lancashire
West of Scotland FC players
Scotland international rugby union players
Glasgow District (rugby union) players
Cities District players
Rugby union forwards